Tonhalle Düsseldorf is a concert hall in Düsseldorf. It was built by the architect Wilhelm Kreis. The resident orchestra, the Düsseldorfer Symphoniker, play symphonic repertoire at the Tonhalle as well as opera at the Deutsche Oper am Rhein.

History

It was built in 1926  for the GeSoLei exhibition as a planetarium, the biggest in the world at the point of construction. During the 1970s it was converted into a concert hall.

References

Culture in Düsseldorf
Buildings and structures in Düsseldorf
Concert halls in Germany
Tourist attractions in Düsseldorf
Modernist architecture in Germany
Music venues completed in 1926
Defunct planetaria